Ullrich congenital muscular dystrophy is a form of congenital muscular dystrophy. It is associated with variants of type VI collagen, it is commonly associated with muscle weakness and respiratory problems, though cardiac issues are not associated with this type of CMD. It is named after Otto Ullrich, who is also known for the Ullrich-Turner syndrome.

Signs and symptoms
The presentation of Ullrich congenital muscular dystrophy in an affected individual is as follows:
 Muscle weakness
 Difficulty walking
 Contractures (predominantly in proximal muscles, e.g. neck)
 Joint looseness (predominantly in distal joints)

Genetics

In terms of the genetics of Ullrich congenital muscular dystrophy, there are mutations in the genes COL6A1, COL6A2, and COL6A3. This sub-type of muscular dystrophy is autosomal recessive in nature.

COL6A1 plays an important part in maintaining the human body's integrity of various tissues. Alpha 1 subunit of type VI collagen is the encoded protein.

Diagnosis

In terms of the diagnosis of Ullrich congenital muscular dystrophy upon inspection follicular hyperkeratosis, may be a dermatological indicator, additionally also serum creatine kinase may be mildly above normal. Other exams/methods to ascertain if the individual has Ullrich congenital muscular dystrophy are:
 MRI
 Biopsy muscle
 Genetic testing

Differential diagnosis

This includes

Treatment

Treatment for Ullrich congenital muscular dystrophy can consist of physical therapy and regular stretching to prevent and reduce contractures. Respiratory support may be needed at some point by the affected individual.

Though cardiac complications are not a concern in this type of CMD, in regards to respiratory issues ventilation via a tracheostomy is a possibility in some cases.

Prognosis
The prognosis of this sub-type of MD indicates that the affected individual may eventually have feeding difficulties. Surgery, at some point, might be an option for scoliosis.

Scoliosis, which is a sideways curve of the persons vertebrate, is determined by a variety of factors, including the degree (mild or severe), in which case if possible a brace might be used by the individual.

Research

In terms of possible research for Ullrich congenital muscular dystrophy one source indicates that cyclosporine A might be of benefit to individuals with this CMD type.

According to a review by Bernardi, et al., cyclosporin A (CsA) used to treat collagen VI muscular dystrophies demonstrates a normalization of mitochondrial reaction to rotenone.

See also
 Muscular dystrophy
 Congenital muscular dystrophy

References

Further reading

External links 

Myoneural junction and neuromuscular diseases
Collagen disease